The Willard L. Eccles Observatory (WEO) is an astronomical observatory located on Frisco Peak in the San Francisco Mountains of Utah (USA), about  northwest of Milford, Utah. The observatory is owned and operated by the University of Utah, and opened in 2010. The observatory features a  Ritchey-Chretien telescope built by DFM Engineering on an equatorial mount. The construction of the observatory was funded by donations from the Willard L. Eccles Foundation and the E.R. & E.W. Dumke Foundation.

See also
 West Mountain Observatory
 List of astronomical observatories

References

External links
 Department of Physics & Astronomy at the University of Utah
 Willard L. Eccles Observatory Clear Sky Chart Forecasts of observing conditions.

Astronomical observatories in Utah
Buildings and structures at the University of Utah
Buildings and structures in Beaver County, Utah
2009 establishments in Utah
University and college buildings completed in 2009